Marco Chiavarini (born 25 May 1972) is a former Italian middle-distane runner who was 6th at the 2000 European Indoor Championships in 800 metres.

Italian 800 meters indoor champion 1995

Career
At the end of 2020 outdoor season his personal best 1:45.05 in 800 m, ran in 1995, is still the 8th Italian best performance of all-time. This personal best in 1995 was also the 25th world best performance.

Achievements

National titles
Chiavarini won a national championship at individual senior level.
 Italian Athletics Indoor Championships
 800 m: 1995

See also
 Italian all-time top lists – 800 metres
 Italian national track relay team
 Italy at the Military World Games

Notes and references

External links

1972 births
Living people
Italian male middle-distance runners
Sportspeople from the Metropolitan City of Turin
Athletics competitors of Centro Sportivo Carabinieri